Tall poppy syndrome is an informal term used to describe the behaviour of individuals who have achieved notable public success but who persist in frequently and excessively praising their own success and opinions. Intense scrutiny and criticism of such a person is termed as "Cutting down the tall poppy". Successful individuals who do not excessively praise their own actions and opinions, may not be regarded as tall poppies. These other individuals could be considered targets of harassment or confused with imposter syndrome.

In Australia and New Zealand, "cutting down the tall poppy" is sometimes used by business entrepreneurs to describe those who deliberately criticise other people for their success and achievements. It has been described as being the by-product of the Australian and New Zealand cultural value of egalitarianism.

In Japan, a similar common expression is "the nail that sticks up gets hammered down". In the Netherlands, this expression is "don't put your head above ground level" (boven het maaiveld uitsteken), with the cultural phenomenon being named  Maaiveldcultuur.

In Chile, this expression is known as "chaquetear" ('pull the jacket'). In Scandinavia, this expression is known as Law of Jante. The Law of Jante comes with "rules" such as "you're not to think you are anything special".

Etymology
The concept originates from accounts in Herodotus' Histories (Book 5, 92f), Aristotle's Politics (1284a) and Livy's Ab urbe condita libri (Book I, ch.54), with reversed roles, referring to Periander's advice to Thrasybulus of Miletus via a herald.

The specific reference to poppies occurs in Livy's account of the tyrannical Roman king Lucius Tarquinius Superbus. He is said to have received a messenger from his son Sextus Tarquinius asking what he should do next in Gabii, since he had become all-powerful there. Rather than answering the messenger verbally, Tarquin went into his garden, took a stick and symbolically swept it across his garden, thus cutting off the heads of the tallest poppies that were growing there. The messenger, tired of waiting for an answer, returned to Gabii and told Sextus what he had seen. Sextus realised that his father wished him to put to death all of the most eminent people of Gabii, which he then did.

See also

 Crab mentality
 Law of Jante
 Leveling mechanism
 Taking the piss
 The Moral Basis of a Backward Society
 Negative selection (politics)

References

Further reading

External links
 
 Flogging the tall-poppy syndrome

Australian culture
Canadian culture
New Zealand culture
Political terminology
Sociological terminology
Social status
Lucius Tarquinius Superbus